Dalmeny railway station is a railway station serving the towns of Dalmeny and South Queensferry, about  west of Edinburgh city centre. It is on the Fife Circle Line, located just south of the Forth Bridge.

History 
The current station is the second to serve the town. The first station was on the Port Edgar branch of the Edinburgh and Glasgow Railway which opened on 1 March 1866. The North British Railway closed the original station on 5 March 1890 to be replaced by the existing station at the same time as the opening of the Forth Bridge.

Services 

Electrification 
£55 million is being spent to electrify  of Fife Circle track, between Haymarket and Dalmeny, for use by battery electric multiple units, was begun by Scottish Powerlines in June 2022 and is due to be completed by December 2024.

References

Notes

Sources 

 
 
 
 South Queensferry Branch of the Edinburgh and Glasgow Railway

Railway stations in Edinburgh
Former Forth Bridge Railway stations
Railway stations in Great Britain opened in 1866
Railway stations in Great Britain closed in 1890
Railway stations in Great Britain opened in 1890
Railway stations served by ScotRail
Category B listed buildings in Edinburgh